Deluxe is a studio album by the alternative rock band Better Than Ezra. It has been released by two labels: the original version in 1993 by Swell Records, and the 1995 version by Elektra Records. This is the group's best known album and contains their biggest single, "Good". It is also their debut major label record, as Surprise was entirely self-released and sold.

Track listing
All songs written by Kevin Griffin, except "Heaven" by Kevin Griffin and Tom Drummond.
 "In the Blood" – 4:33
 "Good" – 3:05
 "Southern Gürl" – 4:05
 "The Killer Inside" – 4:50
 "Rosealia" – 4:39
 "Cry in the Sun" – 5:19
 "Teenager" – 4:18
 　  　  　  　 – 1:36
 "Summerhouse" – 2:37
 "Porcelain" – 3:57
 "Heaven" – 4:18
 "This Time of Year" – 4:05
 "Coyote" – 6:14
 "Der Pork und Beans" (a.k.a. "Streetside Jesus") – This hidden industrial metal song begins playing at the 4:20 mark of track 13, 1 minute and 9 seconds after the end of "Coyote."

Personnel
 Kevin Griffin – Guitar, Vocals
 Tom Drummond – Bass
 Cary Bonnecaze – Drums, Vocals

Additional Personnel
 Lili Haydn – Violin
 Melanie Owen – Vocals
 Dan Rothchild – Vocals, Additional Guitar and Various Instruments
 Walt Thompson – Hammond Organ
 Martin Tillman – Cello

Singles

Rosealia 
"Rosealia" was the third single from this album. Written by singer and guitarist Kevin Griffin, the song is about a woman in an abusive relationship. The single peaked at #71 on the Billboard Hot 100. During a concert in Albuquerque on Monday, September 21, 2009, Kevin Griffin explained to the audience that while living for a short time in Santa Fe, NM he had a job waiting tables at The Pink Adobe restaurant.  The restaurant's owner was a woman named Rosalea Murphy, and he wrote this song as a tribute to her.

Charts

Weekly charts

Year-end charts

Certifications

References

Better Than Ezra albums
1993 albums
Elektra Records albums